Rádio Unifei is a campus radio station owned and operated by the Federal University of Itajubá, in Itajubá, Minas Gerais, Brazil, broadcasting on 1570 kHz AM.

The radio station broadcasts mainly non-commercial advertising, Brazilian popular music, university and city news, rock n' roll and reggae music. 
Currently, the station employs three full-time employees and five university students working as "undergraduate monitors".

History
Rádio Unifei was put on the air on 1490 kHz in 1961 under the direction of José Leite, professor at the then-Electrotechnical Institute of Itajubá. Much of the transmission and studio equipment was built or repaired by students. In the 1970s, the station received a commercial license and moved to 1570 kHz, operating with 250 watts.

External links
Technical data from ANATEL

Radio stations in Brazil
Campus, college, student and university radio stations